William Murdock (1720October 17, 1769) was a Scottish-born American statesman in colonial Maryland. During the tensions leading up to the American Revolution he was an important spokesman for the rights of the colonists. He was a delegate representing Maryland in the Stamp Act Congress of 1765.

Murdock was the son of Reverend George Murdock, who brought his family from Scotland to Prince George's County, Maryland, in British America about 1726.
 
When protests over the Stamp Act resulted in calling a Congress of the several colonies in New York City, the Maryland Assembly sent Murdock as one of its delegates. His voice and experience were an important factor in the Declaration of Rights and Grievances produced by that Congress.

Murdock married Anne Addison, and the couple had eight children before she died in 1753. Murdock died on October 17, 1769, at his home, Padsworth Farm, in Prince George's County, Maryland.

See also
Scottish Americans

1720 births
1769 deaths
Colonial politicians from Maryland
People of Maryland in the American Revolution
English emigrants
People of colonial Maryland